The Port Said Lighthouse is one of the most important architectural and tourist landmarks in the city of Port Said in Egypt. Considered a unique example for the evolution of architecture during the nineteenth century in the city, the lighthouse was designed by François Coignet at the request of the Khedive of Egypt and Sudan, Ismail the Magnificent. Construction was completed in 1869, one week prior to the inauguration of the Suez Canal. The lighthouse was built to guide ships passing through the canal. The lighthouse has an octagonal shaped tower that is 56 m high.

History

From 1868 until the end of his reign, Khedive Ismail ordered the construction of lighthouses at different points across Egypt's Mediterranean coast. Among these, the lighthouse of Port Said had special significance owing to its connection to the Suez Canal, the national infrastructure project undertaken during Ismail's reign. Ismail commissioned French architect François Coignet to design the lighthouse, and oversee its construction. Coignet used the novel technique of building the lighthouse out of reinforced concrete. The lack of nearby stone quarries and the cost of importing stone from elsewhere caused those in charge of construction to become interested in the use of concrete.

At the time, the lighthouse was a paragon of modernism worthy of an international reputation. The lighthouse was constructed by layering liquid 20 – 25 cm in thickness. To ensure the structural cohesion of the whole, iron wall ties were inserted. The use of concrete was doubly innovative: employed as a distinct material, not merely a substance for filling, and strengthened with metal rods. Quite simply, reinforced concrete had been invented. The use of electric light (powering an arc lamp) made it possible to display a consistent flashing light and it was a state of the art lighthouse at the time.

Nothing of the original Port Said infrastructure remains except for the lighthouse. The buildup of silt along the coast of the port has left the lighthouse inland, where it can no longer serve its original purpose of guiding ships. In 2010, intellectuals called for it to be turned into a museum of maritime transport. In January 2011, the Port Said lighthouse was officially registered as a national monument in Egypt.

See also

"Egypt Carrying the Light to Asia" statue proposal for Port Said, 1869
List of lighthouses in Egypt

References

External links

 (in English)
 (in English)

Lighthouses completed in 1869
Port Said
Lighthouses in Asia
Port Said
Buildings and structures in Port Said Governorate
1869 establishments in Egypt